Zaliha binti Mustafa (born 8 June 1964) is a Malaysian politician and doctor who has served as the Minister of Health in the Pakatan Harapan (PH) administration under Prime Minister Anwar Ibrahim since December 2022 and the Member of Parliament (MP) for Sekijang since November 2022. She is a member of the People's Justice Party (PKR), a component party of the PH coalition. She is also the Chairperson of the Party Elections Committee (JPP) of PKR. She is also the first female Minister of Health.

Political career

Minister of Health (since 2022) 
On 2 December 2022, Zaliha was announced as the new Minister of Health by Prime Minister Anwar to serve in his his cabinet. She created history as the first female Minister of Health. Her predecessor Khairy Jamaluddin openly congratulated her on her appointment to the position. The following day on 3 December 2022, she officially took office after being sworn in.

Election results

References 

1964 births
Living people
People from Johor Bahru
21st-century Malaysian women politicians
People's Justice Party (Malaysia) politicians